SPC Global Limited, trading as SPC Australia and formerly SPC Ardmona, is an  Australian-based company that specialises in large fruit packing and owns and operates a canning factory in Shepparton. SPCA closed its Mooroopna processing plant in 2011. It sold its Kyabram factory in 2019. It was owned by Coca-Cola Amatil from 2005 until 2019.

History
SPC Australia was formed in 2002 by the merger of the former Shepparton Preserving Company (SPC) and Ardmona. SPC was incorporated as a public listed company in 1912, and Ardmona opened in 1921.

SPC Australia carries the SPC, Goulburn Valley and Ardmona brands. It acquired IXL and Taylors brands in 2004, and sold both brands with the Kyabram factory in 2019 to a group of farmers and growers in the Goulburn Valley.

Financial problems
In October 2013, the company sought financial assistance from the Federal and Victorian governments to modernise it operation. SPCA requested  50 million, including 25 million pledged by the then prime minister, Kevin Rudd, four days before the 2013 federal election. It wanted the Victorian Government to match the Federal grant.

SPCA lost $25 million in 2013, compared to a $70 million profit 8 years earlier. In 2012, SPCA disposed $100 million of fruit bought under contract because it could not be sold, blaming it on "plummeting" local and export orders. A former Coca-Cola Asia executive, Peter Kelly, went to the company in April 2013 to attempt to turn it around.

In early 2014, SPCA sought $25 million of government assistance as part of a plan to upgrade the Shepparton cannery. The proposal was later rejected by the Abbott Government. Shortly afterwards however, the Victorian Government announced that $22 million would be provided.

In November 2016, Woolworths ended its contract with SPCA for the supply of tinned tomatoes and would not renew it. However, the five-year deal to provide tinned fruit was ongoing.

Turnaround 
In March 2014, SPCA signed a deal with Woolworths to supply an extra  of local product, worth $70 million, over five years. They will supply Woolworths with beans, canned tomato soups and all its home brand fruit.

Peter Kelly, SPCA managing director, said that Australian consumers were buying more fruit in response to the company's problems, with sales in the first 2 months of 2014 up by 60% at Woolworths alone.

In June 2019, it was announced that Coca-Cola Amatil had sold the SPC business to a group called Shepparton Partners Collective, for $40 million. Shepparton Partners Collective is a joint venture between Perma Funds Management, a boutique investment house, and The Eights, a private equity firm. The sale was subject to a four-year deferred payment which, subject to business performance, could generate a further $15 million for Coca-Cola on top of the money paid up-front.

SPC Football Club
The SPC Football Club won the 1945 Goulburn Valley Football Association – Lightening Premiership which was held on the King's Birthday public holiday.

SPC were runners up to Shepparton East in the 1945 Goulburn Valley Football Association grand final.

SPC defeated Numurkah in the 1948 Central Goulburn Valley Football League's seconds grand final. and in 1949 SPC were defeated by Shepparton in the 1949 Central Goulburn Valley Football League's senior football grand final.

SPC merged with Shepparton East in 1950 to form City United, later named the Shepparton United Football Club and entered a senior team in Goulburn Valley Football League.

References

External links

  

Food and drink companies of Australia
Australian jam and preserved fruit makers
2002 establishments in Australia
Canned food
Baked beans
Convenience foods